Mingela is a rural town and locality in the Charters Towers Region, Queensland, Australia.

Geography
Mingela railway station is on the Great Northern railway from Townsville to Mount Isa. Prior to 16 March 1931, it was known as Ravenswood Junction railway station. Haughton Valley railway station is an abandoned railway station on the same line.

History 
The area was originally called Cunningham and then Ravenswood Junction. However, when the Ravenswood branch railway closed on 16 March 1931, the railway station was then renamed Mingela (an Aboriginal word meaning a string of waterholes).

Ravenswood Junction Provisional School opened on 3 January 1882. Circa 1910 it became Ravenswood Junction State School. In 1931 it was renamed Mingela State School. It closed on 31 December 2002. The school was at 33 Burdekin Street. The school's website was archived.

The locality of Mingela was created on 8 July 2016 by combining the former locality of Crimea with parts of Ravenswood, Reid River and Dotswood.

Amenities 
The Mingela branch of the Queensland Country Women's Association meets at the CWA Hall on the corner of Ravenswood Street and Towers Street.

References

External links 
 Town map of Mingela, 1976

Towns in Queensland
Charters Towers Region
Localities in Queensland